William Herbert Johnson (12 May 1889-15 July 1960) was the 5th Anglican Bishop of Ballarat in Australia.

Johnson was born in Brighton, South Australia, on 12 May 1889. He was educated at St Peter's College, Adelaide, Adelaide University and St John's Theological College, Melbourne. He was ordained in 1914 and his first ministry position was as a curate at Holy Trinity, Kew, in Melbourne. After World War I service as a chaplain to the AIF he was the rector of St Cuthbert's Prospect, South Australia, where he remained until his appointment as the Dean of Newcastle. In 1936 he was ordained to the episcopate and was in post at his death on 15 July 1960.

References

1889 births
People from Adelaide
People educated at St Peter's College, Adelaide
University of Adelaide alumni
People educated at St John's Theological College, Melbourne
Anglican Church of Australia deans
Anglican bishops of Ballarat
20th-century Anglican bishops in Australia
1960 deaths
Australian military chaplains
World War I chaplains